Ich (also Romanized as Īch; also known as Aiye, Ayeh, Eiy, and Īj) is a small village in Chavarzaq Rural District, Chavarzaq District, Tarom County, Zanjan Province, Iran. At the 2006 census, its population was 609, in 145 families.

References 

Populated places in Tarom County